The Ntungamo–Mirama Hills Road is a road in the Western Region of Uganda, connecting the towns of Ntungamo and Mirama Hills, both in Ntungamo District.

Location
The coordinates of the road near Ruhaama are 0°59'07.0"S, 30°21'03.0"E (Latitude:-0.985278; Longitude:30.350833).

Upgrading to bitumen
On 6 October 2014, President Yoweri Museveni officially commissioned the upgrading of this road to a bitumen surface. It is funded jointly by the government of Uganda (50 percent) and TradeMark East Africa, a subsidiary of the United Kingdom's Department for International Development (US$22 million). The road was expected to be ready for use in April 2016. After delays related to land compensation, the expected completion date was moved to December 2016. In September 2017, The EastAfrican, reported that the road had been completed.

See also
 Economy of Uganda
 List of roads in Uganda

References

External links
 Uganda National Road Authority Homepage
  Ugandan Government Increases Road Network Funding

 

Roads in Uganda
Ntungamo District
Ankole sub-region
Western Region, Uganda